Charaphloeus is a genus of beetles in the family Laemophloeidae, containing the following species:

 Charaphloeus adustus LeConte
 Charaphloeus alticola Sharp
 Charaphloeus amulae Sharp
 Charaphloeus annectens Sharp
 Charaphloeus bituberculatus Reitter
 Charaphloeus carabinus Sharp
 Charaphloeus celatus Sharp
 Charaphloeus clavicornis Sharp
 Charaphloeus convexulus LeConte
 Charaphloeus convexus Grouvelle
 Charaphloeus corporalis Sharp
 Charaphloeus dimidiatus Schaeffer
 Charaphloeus distans Sharp
 Charaphloeus flavescens Sharp
 Charaphloeus flavosignatus Schaeffer
 Charaphloeus frequens Sharp
 Charaphloeus guatemalenus Sharp
 Charaphloeus insolitus Sharp
 Charaphloeus inustus Sharp
 Charaphloeus optatus Sharp
 Charaphloeus striatus Sharp

References

Laemophloeidae
Cucujoidea genera